Kathryn Kuhlman (May 9, 1907 - February 20, 1976) was an American evangelist who is best known as a 'faith healer' who hosted healing services.

Early and personal life
Kathryn Johanna Kuhlman was born near Concordia, Missouri to German-American parents Joseph Adolph Kuhlman and Emma Walkenhorst. Several years after a spiritual experience at age 14, she began itinerant preaching with her elder sister and brother-in-law in Idaho. Later, she was ordained by the Evangelical Church Alliance.

Kuhlman's future husband, Burroughs Waltrip, was a Texas evangelist. Waltrip divorced his first wife, left his family, moved to Mason City, Iowa and started a revival center called Radio Chapel, for which Kuhlman and her pianist friend, Helen Gulliford, helped him raise funds.

After a romance between Waltrip and Kuhlman began, she told her friends that she could not "find the will of God in the matter", seemingly feeling guilt-ridden. On October 18, 1938, she secretly married "Mister," as she called Waltrip, in Mason City, but the wedding supposedly brought her no peace. The couple had no children and eventually separated in 1944, divorcing in 1948.

Regarding her marriage, in a 1952 interview with the Denver Post, Kuhlman stated, "He charged - correctly - that I refused to live with him. And I haven't seen him in eight years."  On many occasions, Kuhlman expressed remorse for her part in the pain caused by the breakup of Waltrip's previous marriage, citing Waltrip's children's heartbreak as particularly troubling to her. She claimed it was the single greatest regret of her life, second only to the betrayal of her loving relationship with Jesus.

In 1955, in her late 40s, despite being told by doctors about a heart condition, Kuhlman kept a very busy schedule, often traveling across the United States and abroad, holding two to six-hour long meetings which could last late into the evenings.

Kuhlman's devotion to her ministry was summed up in the 1976 biography 'Daughter of Destiny' written by Jamie Buckingham; "The television ministry itself required more than $30,000 a week. To stop, to even cut back, would mean she was beginning to fail. The same was true with the miracle services. As the pain in her chest grew almost unbearable, instead of holding fewer services, she increased the number."

Ministry
Kuhlman traveled extensively around the United States and abroad holding healing crusades between the 1940s and 1970s. She was one of the most well-known healing ministers - faith healers - in the world. Reverend Mother Amanda H. Williams of Brooklyn, New York, a trailblazer for women in Ministry known for her healing ministry helped to birth the healing ministry in Kuhlman. Kuhlman had a weekly TV program in the 1960s and 1970s called 'I Believe In Miracles''' that was aired nationally. She also had a 30-minute nationwide radio program, which featured sermons and, frequently, excerpts from her healing services (both music and message). Her foundation was established in 1954, and its Canadian branch in 1970. Late in her life she was supportive of the nascent Jesus movement, and received endorsements by its key leaders, including David Wilkerson and Chuck Smith.

By 1970 she moved to Los Angeles, conducting healing services for thousands of people, and was often compared to Aimee Semple MacPherson. She became well known for her "gift of healing" despite, as she often noted, having no theological training.  She was friendly with Christian television evangelist Pat Robertson and made guest appearances at his Christian Broadcasting Network (CBN) and on the network's flagship program The 700 Club.

In 1975, Kuhlman was sued by Paul Bartholomew, her personal administrator, who claimed that she kept $1 million in jewelry and $1 million in fine art hidden away and sued her for $430,500 for breach of contract. Two former associates accused her in the lawsuit of diverting funds and of illegally removing records, which she denied and said the records were not private. According to Kuhlman, the lawsuit was settled prior to trial.

Healing
An estimated two million people reported they were healed in her meetings over the years.

Following a 1967 fellowship in Philadelphia, Dr. William A. Nolen conducted a case study of 23 people who said they had been cured during one of her services. Nolen's long term follow-ups concluded that there were no cures in those cases. One woman who was said to have been cured of spinal cancer threw away her brace and ran across the stage at Kuhlman's command; her spine collapsed the next day and she died four months later. 

Nolen's analysis of Kulhman came in for criticism from believers. Lawrence Althouse, a physician, said that Nolen had attended only one of  Kuhlman's services and did not follow up with all of those who said they had been healed there. Dr. Richard Casdorph produced a book of evidence in support of miraculous healings by Kuhlman. Hendrik van der Breggen, a Christian philosophy professor, argued in favor of the claims. Author Craig Keener concluded, "No one claims that everyone was healed, but it is also difficult to dispute that significant recoveries occurred, apparently in conjunction with prayer. One may associate these with Kathryn Kuhlman's faith or that of the supplicants, or, as in some of Kuhlman's teaching, to no one's faith at all; but the evidence suggests that some people were healed, even in extraordinary ways."

Dr. Richard Owellen, a member of the cancer‐research department of the Johns Hopkins Hospital who appeared frequently at Miss Kuhlman's services, testified to various healings that he said he had investigated.

Death
In July 1975, her doctor diagnosed her with a minor heart flare-up; in November, she had a relapse. As a result, Kuhlman underwent open-heart surgery in Tulsa, Oklahoma, during which she died on February 20, 1976. It was reported in her biography that at the time of her passing in the hospital, a bright light was witnessed hovering over her lifeless body.

Kathryn Kuhlman was buried in the Forest Lawn Memorial Park Cemetery in Glendale, California. A plaque in her honor is in the main city park in Concordia, Missouri, a town in central Missouri on Interstate Highway 70.

After she died, her will led to controversy. She left $267,500, the bulk of her estate, to three members of her family and twenty of her employees. Smaller bequests were given to 19 other employees. According to the Independent Press-Telegram, her employees were disappointed when they learned that "she did not leave most of her estate to the foundation as she had done under a previous 1974 will." The Kathryn Kuhlman Foundation had continued, but due to lack of funding, it terminated its nationwide radio broadcast in 1982. Ultimately, the Foundation closed its doors in April 2016.

Legacy
Many believers uphold Kuhlman as an important forerunner to the present-day charismatic movement. She influenced faith healers Benny Hinn and Billy Burke. Hinn has adopted some of her techniques and he also wrote a book about Kuhlman, because he frequently attended her preaching services. However, Billy Burke did meet her and was counseled by her, having claimed a miracle healing in her service as a young boy.

In 1981, David Byrne and Brian Eno sampled one of Kuhlman's sermons for a track which they created during sessions for their collaborative album My Life in the Bush of Ghosts. After failing to clear the license to Kuhlman's voice from her estate, the track was reworked to use audio from an unidentified exorcism, with this modified version being released as "The Jezebel Spirit". The Kuhlman version was later included on the 1992 bootleg recording Ghosts, titled "Into the Spirit Womb".

Bibliography
Kathryn Kuhlman, I Believe in Miracles, Prentice-Hall Publishers (1962)
Kathryn Kuhlman, God Can Do It Again, (1969)
Kathryn Kuhlman, Nothing Is Impossible With God, Bridge-Logos Publishers (1974)
Kathryn Kuhlman, Never Too Late, Bridge-Logos Publishers (1975)

Biography

Wayne E. Warner, Kathryn Kuhlman, The Woman Behind the Miracles, Servant Publications/New Wine Press (1993)
Artman, Amy Collier, The Miracle Lady: Kathryn Kuhlman and the Transformation of Charismatic Christianity'', Wm. B. Eerdmans Publishing Co., (2019)

See also
 Benny Hinn
 John G Lake
 A.A. Allen
 Sid Roth's It's Supernatural, a television talk show which is hosted by televangelist Sid Roth, a Jewish convert to Christianity who admires Kathryn Kuhlman and Benny Hinn

References

External links
Kathryn Kuhlman Foundation – Official website

Joan Gieson with Kathryn Kuhlman

1907 births
1976 deaths
20th-century Protestants
People from Lafayette County, Missouri
American Methodists
Burials at Forest Lawn Memorial Park (Glendale)
American faith healers
American Charismatics
Oral Roberts University people
American people of German descent
American evangelicals